The term Clayton, New York could refer to either of two locations on St. Lawrence River:

 Clayton (town), New York
 Clayton (village), New York

See also 
 Clayton (disambiguation)